Svamitva Scheme (Survey of Villages Abadi and Mapping with Improvised Technology in Village Area) is a property survey program launched by Indian Prime Minister Narendra Modi on April 24, 2020, as a central-sector scheme to promote socio-economic empowerment and a more self-reliant rural India. About 6.62 lakh villages across the country will be surveyed in this scheme from 2021 to 2025, using varied technology including drones to collect property data. The initial phase of the scheme was implemented during 2020-21 in select villages of Maharashtra, Karnataka, Haryana, Uttar Pradesh, Uttarakhand, Madhya Pradesh, Punjab and Rajasthan.

The scheme is intended to reduce property disputes by providing accurate land records while boosting financial liquidity. The scheme aims to streamline planning and revenue collection, as well as ensuring residents are informed of property rights in rural areas.

References

Modi administration initiatives
Government schemes in India
Land management in India